The Buick Encore GX is a subcompact crossover SUV built by General Motors starting in 2019. Like the smaller Encore, the Encore GX is manufactured by GM Korea. In China, it is manufactured by the SAIC-GM joint venture.

Overview

The Encore GX was revealed alongside the second generation Encore at the 2019 Shanghai Auto Show.  It shares the VSS-F platform with the new Chevrolet Trailblazer crossover SUV. The size of the Encore GX is subcompact-plus, meaning that it slots between the subcompact Encore and the compact Envision.

North America

In North America, the Encore GX was introduced at the Los Angeles Auto Show in November 2019, and made its debut in early 2020 for the 2020 model year. It slots in between the smaller Buick Encore and the midsize Buick Envision, but it does not replace the Buick Encore in the North American market. The Encore GX includes several standard safety assistance features, such as automatic emergency braking, forward collision alert, and lane departure warning.

The Encore GX launched in three trims: Preferred, Select, and Essence.  It also gets a Sport Touring package that adds visual enhancements such as a custom grille with Red accents, sporty front & rear bumpers with Red accents, body-colored moldings, and exclusive 18-inch wheels, but no mechanical upgrades.

Two engines are available.  The first, a 1.2-liter, turbocharged 3-cylinder engine producing  and  torque, is standard on front-wheel-drive models with a CVT.  The second, a 1.3-liter, turbocharged 3-cylinder engine producing  and  torque, is standard on all-wheel-drive models with a 9-speed automatic transmission.  It is also available on Select and Essence trims with FWD and the CVT.  While the new I3 engines are available in several GM models in China, they are the first three-cylinder engines in a GM car in North America since the Geo/Chevrolet Metro.

Trim levels

In North America, the Encore GX is offered in base Preferred, mid-level Select, and luxury-oriented Essence trim levels, all including a 1.2L EcoTec turbocharged inline three-cylinder (I3) gasoline engine, continuously variable transmission (CVT) and front wheel drive.  Both all wheel drive and a 1.3L EcoTec I3 gasoline engine with a traditional nine-speed automatic transmission are available on all models.

Mexico
In Mexico, the Encore GX was launched in February 2020 and is marketed simply as the Encore. It is offered there in Convenience, Leather, and Sport Touring trim levels.  The 1.3 L turbo I3 is the only engine available.  The Encore GX replaces the original Encore in Mexico, unlike the US and Canada where both are available.

Awards
U.S. News & World Report ranked the Buick Encore GX at No. 5 on its list of Best Subcompact SUVs for 2022, giving it a score of 8.1 out of 10.

Sales

References

External links

 

Encore GX
Crossover sport utility vehicles
Compact sport utility vehicles
Mini sport utility vehicles
Cars introduced in 2019
2020s cars
Vehicles with CVT transmission